A warhead is an explosive device used in military conflicts.

Warhead may also refer to:

Film and television
 Warhead (film), a 1977 American film directed by John O'Connor
 Razer (robot) aka Warhead, a combat robot on the British television series Robot Wars
 "Warhead" (Star Trek: Voyager), a Star Trek: Voyager episode
 "Warhead", an episode in the third season of the animated TV series Star Wars Rebels

Music
 Warhead Records, a heavy metal record label in Sydney, Australia
 "Warhead", a song by electronic musician Krust
 "Warhead", a song by nu metal band Otep
 "Warhead", a song by heavy metal band Tarot
 "Warhead", a song by punk rock band U.K. Subs
 "Warhead", a song by black metal band Venom

Other
 Warhead (video game), a 1989 3D space combat simulator for Amiga and Atari ST platforms
 "Warhead", a science fiction novel by Ricardo Delgado
 "Warhead", a component of agents used in Activity-based proteomics
 Cat's Cradle: Warhead, novel by Andrew Cartmel based on Doctor Who
 Crysis Warhead, a 2008 expansion pack for the video game Crysis

See also
 Warheads (disambiguation)